Jamestown Public Schools is a system of public schools located in Jamestown, North Dakota.

History
Robert Lech, previously superintendent of Pleasant School District and Beulah Public Schools, became superintendent effective July 1, 2013. He was ranked North Dakota Superintendent of the year in 2016.

Schools

Elementary schools
Wm. S. Gussner Elementary School
Lincoln Elementary School
Louis L’Amour Elementary School
Roosevelt Elementary School
Washington Elementary School

Middle school
Jamestown Middle School

High school
Jamestown High School
Jamestown North (alternative high school)

Career and technical training
James Valley Career & Technology Center
JHS Transitional Living (for students with disabilities)

References

External links
Jamestown Public Schools

School districts in North Dakota
Education in Stutsman County, North Dakota
Jamestown, North Dakota